Martin Roland Strandberg  (born 2 February 1975) is a Swedish Olympic sailor. He finished 12th in the Tornado event at the 2000 Summer Olympics together with Magnus Lövdén and 14th in the Tornado event at the 2004 Summer Olympics together with Kristian Mattsson.

References

Swedish male sailors (sport)
Olympic sailors of Sweden
Tornado class sailors
Malmö Segelsällskap sailors
Sailors at the 2000 Summer Olympics – Tornado
Sailors at the 2004 Summer Olympics – Tornado
1975 births
Living people